PWBA may refer to:

Professional Women's Bowling Association
Pension and Welfare Benefits Administration
Plane Wave Born Approximation